Lovisa Charlotta Malm-Reuterholm (1768–1845) was a Finnish - Swedish artist, painter, writer and noble.

Biography
She was the daughter of Major Jacob Georgsson Malm (1735–1789) and Eleonora Lovisa von Köhnnigstedt (1745–1821).
She married Baron  Axel Christian Reuterholm (1753–1811) in 1797. Her husband served as the president of  The Court of Appeal in Vaasa (Vaasa Hovrätt). She is represented on the portrait collection of the Vaasa Court of Appeal. 

She was a Dilettante painter.   She also published a book of psalms in three parts in 1820–1846.

She was buried at Strängnäs Cathedral in the Diocese of Strängnäs, Sweden.

References

Other sources

 Svenskt konstnärslexikon (Swedish art dictionary) Allhems Förlag, Malmö (In Swedish)

1768 births
1845 deaths
Finnish women writers
18th-century Finnish nobility
Finnish writers in Swedish
Finnish women painters
18th-century Finnish painters
19th-century Finnish painters
18th-century Swedish painters
19th-century Swedish painters
19th-century Finnish women artists
19th-century Swedish women artists
18th-century Swedish women artists